Sutaji (born 1975) is a retired Indonesian footballer who plays as a midfielder.

Honours
Persebaya Surabaya
 Liga Indonesia (1): 1996-97

Arema Malang
 Copa Indonesia (2): 2005, 2006

External links
Goal.com

Indonesian footballers
1975 births
Living people
Association football midfielders
Persema Malang players
Arema F.C. players
Persebaya Surabaya players
PSS Sleman players
People from Sidoarjo Regency
Sportspeople from East Java